Cordylus namakuiyus, the Kaokoveld girdled lizard, is a species of lizard in the family Cordylidae. It is a small, spiny lizard found in Angola.

References

Cordylus
Reptiles of Angola
Endemic fauna of Angola
Reptiles described in 2016
Taxa named by Edward L. Stanley
Taxa named by Luis M. P. Ceríaco
Taxa named by Suzana Bandeira
Taxa named by William Roy Branch